Bardell Rock is a rock nearly  south of Dickens Rocks in the Pitt Islands, northern Biscoe Islands. It was named by the UK Antarctic Place-Names Committee in 1971 after Mrs. Bardell, a character in Charles Dickens' The Pickwick Papers.

References 

Rock formations of the Biscoe Islands